Mawgan Porth Dark Age Village is a small ancient settlement consisting of 3 courtyard house complexes and a cemetery on the North coast of Cornwall dating from the 10th century. It was excavated in 1950-54 by Rupert Bruce-Mitford. The site was first discovered after the apparent after the discovery of the skeleton in 1934. The landowner. Mr P A Wailes, had wanted to build on the land and soundings to test the subsoil revealed the skeleton, stone walls, pottery and bone fragments.

Excavations
A trial excavation was carried out in 1948, and this led to larger scale investigation, between 1950 and 1954

Cemetery
The cemetery contained several adult and child burials enclosed in slab graves. Pottery finds from the excavations form were distinctive forms, partly inspired by the bar-lug tradition of Scilly and Cornwall

Finds
Finds from the site are archived at the British Museum and negatives of Charles Woolf's photographs are held by the Photographic Library of English Heritage

Dark Age Cornwall
At one time, very little was known of the period known as the 'Dark Ages' in Cornwall. The Cornwall edition of Victoria County History, only lists stones crosses and the silver hoard that was found at Trewhiddle in 1974. However, the Trewhiddle hoard is one of the finest collections of Early Medieval silverwork found in Britain. 

More recent excavations at Tintagel as well as previous digs at Duckpool, St Pirans Oratory near Perranporth and a Settlement excavated at Gunwalloe paint the picture of a vibrant country with a rich and literate elite.

External links
 British Museum collection Picture of a Bar lug cooking pot excavated at the site

Further reading

 A Dark Age Settlement at Mawgan Porth, Publisher: Routledge 1956, by Rupert Bruce-Mitford
 Saxon England: by John Hamilton (Author), Alan Sorrell (Illustrator) 1964. 
 Supposed Iron Age Burial at Mawgan Porth (JRIC No 83, Vol XXIV, 1936), Hirst, FC, 1936,
 'Mawgan Porth Remembered', Cornish Archaeol. 37–8 (2002 for 1998–9),  Ashbee, Paul

References

Buildings and structures in Cornwall
History of Cornwall
Archaeological sites in Cornwall
Former populated places in Cornwall
Cornish courtyard houses